John Harrington Stevens (June 13, 1820 – May 28, 1900) was the first authorized colonial resident on the west bank of the Mississippi River in what would become Minneapolis, Minnesota. He was granted permission to occupy the site, then part of the Fort Snelling military reservation, in exchange for providing ferry service to St. Anthony across the river. The Stevens House was moved several times, finally to Minnehaha Park in south Minneapolis in 1896. The house is now a museum, with tours available on summer weekends. The home was considered to be a civic and social hub of the city, and was used to organize both Hennepin County and the city of Minneapolis.

Stevens was born in Brompton Falls, Quebec, Canada. He attained the rank of colonel in the U.S. Army, and was involved in the Mexican–American War {John Stevens did not have official rank of Colonel in the U.S. Army; this was an unofficial title commonly used}. He served in the Minnesota House of Representatives in 1857–1858 and the Minnesota Senate in 1859–1860. He returned to the house once later in 1876.

Minneapolis and St. Anthony merged in 1872, so there are others who can claim to be earlier Minneapolis residents. The oldest existing house from that earlier settlement was built by Ard Godfrey in 1848, two years before Stevens' home; that house is now at the small Chute Square park in the city. 

The Stevens Square Neighborhood in the Central Minneapolis Community is named for John H. Stevens.

References

External links
 Index to Politicians: Stevens, J. The Political Graveyard.
 The Papers of John Harrington Stevens
Photos at the Hennepin County Library
 John H. Stevens
Photos at the Minnesota Historical Society
 John H. Stevens 01
 John H. Stevens 02
 John H. Stevens 03
 John H. Stevens 04

Minnesota state senators
Members of the Minnesota House of Representatives
1820 births
1900 deaths
Politicians from Minneapolis
History of Minneapolis
19th-century American politicians